Consuming Spirits is a 2012 American animated drama film directed by Chris Sullivan and his directorial debut. Partially autobiographical, the movie released on December 12, 2012 in New York City and employs a diverse mixture of different animation styles to tell the stories of three different characters and the anguish they face in their everyday lives.

Synopsis
The movie follows the lives of three residents of the fictional town of Magguson, all of whom work at the town's newspaper The Daily Suggester. While at first the interactions between the three people appear to show a superficial working relationship between them, as the movie progresses the viewer learns that there is a deeper relationship between them all and that all of them have hidden secrets.

Cast
Nancy Andrews as Gentian Violet (voice)
Chris Sullivan as Victor Blue (voice)
Judith Rafael as Mother Beatrice Elastica (voice)
Mary Lou Zelazny as Ida Blue (voice)
Chris Harris as Peabody Shampling (voice)
Robert Levy as Earl Gray (voice)

Reception
Critical reception for Consuming Spirits has been predominantly positive and the film holds a score of 81 on Metacritic (based on 12 reviews) and 89% on Rotten Tomatoes (based on 18 reviews). Despite this, a Swiss site reported that most of the audience left the theater during a showing at the Fantoche animated film festival in Baden, Switzerland. A reviewer for NPR recommended the film and called it "emotionally raw, thoroughly original".

Awards
Chicago Award at the  Chicago International Film Festival (2012, won)

References

External links
 
 
 
 
 NY Times

2012 films
2012 drama films
2010s American animated films
2012 animated films
American independent films
American drama films
American avant-garde and experimental films
Animated drama films
Anifilm award winners
2010s avant-garde and experimental films
2012 independent films
2010s English-language films